The 1978 Grand National (officially known as The Sun Grand National for sponsorship reasons) was the 132nd renewal of the Grand National horse race that took place at Aintree near Liverpool, England, on 1 April 1978. In a close finish between the leading five horses, the winner was Lucius, by about half a length.

Three times winner Red Rum was declared out of the race due to injury, but was allowed to lead the post parade.

Finishing order

Non-finishers

Media coverage and aftermath
David Coleman was back presenting the special edition of Grandstand after missing the previous year's broadcast. The 1976 winner Rag Trade pulled up lame before the 22nd fence and was later euthanized.

References

 1978
Grand National
Grand National
20th century in Merseyside
Grand National